The Basilica on Tepe's Hill is a Cultural Monument of Albania, located near Elbasan.

References

Cultural Monuments of Albania
Buildings and structures in Elbasan